Agatsuma may refer to:

, Japanese shamisen player
, Japanese softball player
Agatsuma District, Gunma, a district in Gunma Prefecture, Japan
Agatsuma, Gunma, a town in Gunma Prefecture, Japan
Agatsuma River, a river in Japan
Agatsuma Entertainment, a Japanese toy/video game company
Zenitsu Agatsuma, a character from the manga/anime series Kimetsu no Yaiba (Demon Slayer)

Japanese-language surnames